Michael McCarthy (born November 18, 1987) is an American professional baseball coach for the Oakland Athletics of Major League Baseball.

McCarthy was born in Walnut Creek, California, and raised in Brentwood. He graduated from Liberty High School and enrolled at the University of Redlands to play college baseball for the Redlands Bulldogs. He transferred to California State University, Bakersfield to continue his collegiate career with the Cal State Bakersfield Roadrunners in 2008.

The Boston Red Sox selected McCarthy in the 14th round of the 2011 MLB draft, and he reached Triple-A in 2014. He played professional baseball until 2016. In 2018, he became the bullpen coach for the Rochester Red Wings, the Triple-A affiliate of the Minnesota Twins. In 2022, he was the pitching coach for the El Paso Chihuahuas, the Triple-A affiliate of the San Diego Padres.

The Athletics named McCarthy to their coaching staff as their bullpen coach for the 2023 season.

References

External links

Living people
1987 births
People from Brentwood, California
Redlands Bulldogs baseball players
Cal State Bakersfield Roadrunners baseball players
Rochester Red Wings coaches
Oakland Athletics coaches
Major League Baseball bullpen coaches